Clemente Marroquín Rojas (12 August 1897 – 8 April 1978) was Guatemalan journalist and politician.

He was elected as Vice President of Guatemala for period from 1 July 1966 to 30 June 1970 as running mate of Julio César Méndez. He served also a one-year-term as First Vice President from March 1958 to March 1959, elected by Congress that time.

References

1897 births
1978 deaths
Vice presidents of Guatemala
Guatemalan journalists
Male journalists
20th-century journalists
Agriculture ministers of Guatemala